Siegfried "Wumm" Lemke (7 April 1921 – 18 December 1995) was a Luftwaffe ace and recipient of the Knight's Cross of the Iron Cross during World War II. The Knight's Cross of the Iron Cross was awarded to recognise extreme battlefield bravery or successful military leadership. During his career he was credited with between 70 and 96 aerial victories.

Biography
Lemke was born on 7 April 1921 in Schivelbein, Farther Pomerania (today Świdwin, Poland).

In the autumn of 1942, Unteroffizier Lemke was posted to the 1. Staffel (1st squadron) of Jagdgeschwader 2 "Richthofen" (JG 2—2nd Fighter Wing), based on the French coast. His was to remain with JG 2 throughout the rest of the war. His first victory came on 12 March 1943 when he downed an RAF Spitfire fighter near Fécamp. He was promoted to Staffelführer of his squadron on 12 September 1943.

In late January 1944, I. Gruppe under the command of Hauptmann Erich Hohagen was moved to Aix-en-Provence Aerodrome in southern France. There the unit fought against the 15th Air Force of the United States Army Air Forces (USAAF). On 9 February 1944 Lemke shot down four Spitfires southeast of Cannes - one of which was flown by American pilot Bob Hoover - to move his tally to 19 victories. His squadron were again transferred to Italy to counter the Allied landings at Anzio. In March, 1944 Lemke added sixteen further victories to his tally. The USAAF sent 200 Boeing B-17 Flying Fortress and 80 Consolidated B-24 Liberator bombers to the Rome marshalling yards on 3 March. The bombers were escorted by Republic P-47 Thunderbolt fighters of which two were shot down by Lemke.

By the early summer of 1944, Lemke's squadron was again moved, this time to Creil, an airfield north of Paris. From here Lemke flew combat missions over the developing campaign in Normandy following D-Day. On 14 June 1944, Lemke was awarded the Knight's Cross of the Iron Cross for his then tally of 47 victories.

Group commander
In July 1944, Lemke was appointed Gruppenkommandeur (group commander) of the III. Gruppe of JG 2, replacing Hauptmann Josef Wurmheller who had been killed in action on 22 June. He led this Gruppe until the end of the war.

Lemke flew a total of 325 combat missions and ultimately reached 70 victories, including 25 Spitfires, eight P-47 Thunderbolts, six P-51 Mustangs and at least five four-engine bombers (B-17s).

Summary of career

Aerial victory claims
According to US historian David T. Zabecki, Lemke was credited with 70 aerial victories. Spick lists him with 96 aerial victories claimed in 325 combat missions. This figure includes one claim on the Eastern Front and 95 claims on the Western Front of which 21 are four-engined heavy bombers. Mathews and Foreman, authors of Luftwaffe Aces — Biographies and Victory Claims, researched the German Federal Archives and state that Lemke was credited with more than 54 aerial victory claims, all of which claimed on the Western Front, including at least five four-engined bombers.

Awards
 Aviator badge
 Front Flying Clasp of the Luftwaffe
 Iron Cross (1939) 2nd and 1st Class
 Honour Goblet of the Luftwaffe on 8 May 1944 as Fahnenjunker-Oberfeldwebel and pilot
 German Cross in Gold on 3 April 1944 as Fahnenjunker-Oberfeldwebel in the 1./Jagdgeschwader 2
 Knight's Cross of the Iron Cross on 14 June 1944 as Leutnant and Staffelführer of the 1./Jagdgeschwader 2 "Richthofen"

Notes

References

Citations

Bibliography

 
 
 
 
 
 
 
 
 
 
 

1921 births
1995 deaths
People from Świdwin
People from the Province of Pomerania
Luftwaffe pilots
German World War II flying aces
Recipients of the Gold German Cross
Recipients of the Knight's Cross of the Iron Cross